Anup Baral (born 1968) is actor, writer, director of Nepal.

Filmography

Awards
National film award for the movie Das Dhunga.
 NEFTA Film Awards for supporting actor for the movie Damaruko Dandibiyo

References

1968 births
Living people
Nepalese male actors
Place of birth missing (living people)
People from Pokhara